Infinite Frontier is a 2021 relaunch by the American comic book publisher DC Comics of its entire line of ongoing monthly superhero comic book titles in 2021. It is the follow-up to the 2016 DC Rebirth relaunch. The relaunch and event was shepherded by writer Joshua Williamson. The continuity and repercussions established by Infinite Frontier continue into the 2023 Dawn of DC relaunch.

Changes in the DC Universe
Infinite Frontier begins after the events of Dark Nights: Death Metal, Generations and Future State.

The DC Multiverse has expanded into a larger "Omniverse" where everything is canon and it will still deal with the repercussions of DC Rebirth.

The new Multiverse has two opposite worlds that represent the Metaverse and sustain the balance: one is the Elseworld, and the other is Earth Omega, where Darkseid is imprisoned.

In the new status quo, all of DC history "counts" when understanding a character's backstory, and legacy and history within the franchise is being emphasised by editorial mandate, with many characters now sharing the same codenames. For example, Stephanie Brown and Cassandra Cain share the Batgirl title, while Oracle (Barbara Gordon) reserves the right to also wear the Batgirl costume from time to time. Jonathan Kent and his father Clark Kent are both Superman, while Conner Kent is once again Superboy. Wally West has stepped up as the primary Flash while Barry Allen and the Flash of China, Avery Ho, participate in Justice League Incarnate. While Diana of Themiscyra continues in her role as Wonder Woman from the afterlife, her mother, Hippolyta, serves in Wonder Woman's place on the Justice League, and her sister, Nubia, explores the idea of succeeding Diana as Wonder Woman. The new Batman Jace Fox succeeds Bruce Wayne for a short time, before later serving as the Batman of New York City while Bruce remains in Gotham. Another example of a relaxed approach to codename sharing among legacy characters is Robin: Tim Drake is officially Robin once again, but the previous Robin (Damian Wayne) continues to head up the Robin comic book without an official codename, while newcomer Maps Mizoguchi steps into the role briefly in a short story.

The soft relaunch and new approach to history also completes what began with DC Rebirth in restoring the status quo of characters prior to popular New 52 changes, re-establishing characters' memories and relationships with each other, while selectively retaining some of the simplified backstories from the modern era and many of the new characters. An example of this is Tim Drake once again serving as Robin. Some characters have simply returned to being as fans remembered them; for example, the Black Canary, who in The New 52 had been presented as a singular new version of the character, has been restored to being the daughter of her Golden Age predecessor.

Plot 
After the recreation of the infinite Multiverse, and a look into a possible future of her universe, Wonder Woman, who has ascended after the defeat of The Batman Who Laughs, is offered a role by the Quintessence (Ganthet, Hera, Highfather, the Phantom Stranger, the Spectre, The Wizard) in return for saving the Multiverse. The Spectre takes her to a journey where it is revealed that Roy Harper is resurrected as well as Batman dealing with a mysterious group of enemies. Wonder Woman rejects becoming a part of the Quintessence since she wants to live it rather than just witness it. As she leaves, the Quintessence go to Earth Omega, where they are attacked by Darkseid, who has finally achieved his true form after his past versions were combined into one.

On Earth, everyone is now aware of the Multiverse (as a result of events in Dark Nights: Death Metal), and Alan Scott (who came out to his children) is struggling with living in this new world. He talks with his son Obsidian when the Justice Society of America's headquarters explodes in green flames, and Alan asks where Jade is. In Paris, as Director Bones is talking to Cameron Chase about the recent events that have transpired, Batman (from the Flashpoint era) crashes on Earth 23, where he meets the Justice Incarnate (Calvin Ellis, Mary Marvel from Earth 5, Machinehead from Earth 8, Aquawoman from Earth 11, and Captain Carrot from Earth 26) and asks where the Barry Allen is. While running throughout the multiverse, Barry Allen vibrates through the worlds and arrives in Earth Omega, where he is attacked by the Psycho-Pirate, who wants Barry to find someone. In a diner, Roy Harper deals with an angry customer when an enemy named X-Tract attacks him. Roy Harper wards off the attacker, realizing that he has a Black Lantern ring.

Cameron Chase contacts Batman and Superman about the public being worried about the Multiverse, but Superman and Batman dodge her questions. Thomas Wayne admits that seeing his whole world turned him evil and he does not want his son to know he is alive. Magog of Earth 22 attacks Calvin Ellis and Thomas Wayne, having gone back to his villainous roots. Back on Earth-0, Mr. Terrific tells Vandal Savage, Obsidian, and Alan Scott that there are still people who do not have their memories restored or are missing after the restoration of the Multiverse. Roy Harper starts training with his Black Lantern Ring, but gets overwhelmed by its power. Meanwhile, Cameron Chase confronts Captain Atom but after realizing this Captain Atom is an impostor, the impostor blows himself up.

The Psycho-Pirate puts the Flash on a treadmill in Earth Omega and uses his power to take Barry somewhere else. Obsidian and Alan Scott meet a man named Shade and they realize that an enemy of Obisidian has stolen Jade. The duo goes to Command D, where they are attacked by Director Bones, X-Tract, and Cameron Chase. The Justice Incarnate calm down Magog and, after Magog allows them to touch a mysterious spacecraft, Calvin Ellis tells everyone they need to go back to his Earth. Roy Harper regains control of his Black Lantern ring, but is captured by Hector Hammond when he is saved by the Infinite Incorporated (Power Girl, Jade).

Thomas Wayne and Calvin Ellis go to his office to find Lex Luthor of Earth 23 to get a transmatter symphonic array to travel through universes. They find Lex Luthor of Earth 23 dead, while Cameron Chase is saved by X-Tract from the fake Captain Atom and meets with Detective Bones, who then shoots him in the leg when he finds out that he plans to leave other universes to die. The Infinite Incorporated arrived on Earth Omega, but they are soon attacked. Likewise, Thomas Wayne and Calvin Ellis plan to go to Earth Omega when Machinehead attacks them. Machinehead reveals his world was destroyed when Earth-0 invaded his home and plans to keep the universes separate before calling in the Injustice Incorporated.

On Earth Omega, the Psycho-Pirate explains his world was the original Earth-Two before "Crisis on Infinite Earths", and his world was replaced by a new version. Detective Bones was revealed to have shot down Cameron Chase's ship and says that he made a deal with Darkseid to spare their Earth in exchange for others. Jade knocks down Detective Bones, and X-Tract reveals she was Cameron Chase from the original Earth-Two, and the Psycho-Pirate explains that the Flash is running so Darkseid can cross-dimension to gain enough power to control the Multiverse. Machinehead attacks Calvin Ellis, explaining that when the Flash created Flashpoint, it caused changes to his Earth which made it darker and restrains Calvin Ellis. The Psycho-Pirate nearly persuades Roy Harper to join his side, but slips out that Roy's daughter is still alive. Roy Harper frees everyone, but his overuse of the Black Lantern Ring causes Darkseid to appear.

Obsidian frees Roy Harper from Darkseid, while Thomas Wayne and Calvin Ellis defeat Machinehead. Calvin Ellis destroys the treadmill the Flash was on, which causes the Flash to disappear. Darkseid kills Machinehead and teleports everyone back home while the Psycho-Pirate flees in terror of his failure. X-Tract acquires Roy's Black Lantern ring and meets up with Darkseid, Granny Goodness, DeSaad, Grail (Darkseid's daughter), Steppenwolf and Kalibak, where Darkseid reveals to his elites that Earth-0 is not on Earth but in a place where the Great Darkness rests, which he vows to find the Flash and crack the Omniverse to take control of the Great Darkness, believing that there are other dark forces who were seeking to control it. X-Tract swears her allegiance to him. Director Bones was mentioned to have escaped. The Flash arrives in the Multiverse-2, the ruins of the first Crisis, where he meets Pariah, who transports the Flash to a different Earth for sinister reasons.

Titles

Ongoing series

Limited series

One-shots

Critical reception 
According to Comic Book Roundup, the entire event received an average rating of 8.6 out of 10 based on 110 reviews.

Collected edition

See also
List of current DC Comics publications

Notes

References

Comic book reboots
DC Comics storylines